Parent Airport  is located at Parent, Quebec, Canada.

See also
 Parent Water Aerodrome

References

Registered aerodromes in Mauricie